The MV Tourist No. 2 is a former car ferry with a unique Pacific Northwest history.  Tourist No. 2 is a 1924 wooden-hulled car ferry that has served passengers all over the Pacific Northwest. Originally, it took passengers across the Columbia River, with a dock in Astoria, Oregon.  Currently, it is undergoing restoration in Astoria.  It is listed on the National Register of Historic Places.

History 
With the exception of the Second World War, from 1924 to 1966, MV Tourist No. 2 was in service on the Astoria–Megler Ferry route on the Columbia River. Following the bombing of Pearl Harbor in 1941, the US Army purchased the vessel as the FB or JMP 535 to lay mines at the mouth of the river. At the end of the war, it returned to ferry service on the Columbia. The ferry was moved from Astoria, Oregon to Pierce County, Washington in 1967 and renamed the Islander of Pierce County. It worked on Puget Sound for many years, but eventually its wooden-hull design was overshadowed by vessels with more modern steel-hull designs.

In 1996, new private owners Argosy Cruises bought the vessel and renamed it to Kirkland. They refurbished it, adding two full-service bars, a galley, and 12-foot floor-to-ceiling windows, making the main deck unique among vessels in the Northwest. The exterior styling, deck plan, and interior and general arrangement were provided by designer Jonathan Quinn Barnett of Seattle.  The vessel is listed on the Washington Historic Register and the National Register of Historic Places. 

Early morning, August 28, 2010. the vessel caught fire while docked at its Kirkland, Washington pier.   The fire was confined to the engine room. Firefighters were quoted as saying everything below deck was "toast".    The Boat was moved from Lake Washington during the morning of August 31, 2010 - by the Tug "Dixie"—part of the Fremont Tug Company.

The vessel was sold to Christian Lint in 2010 after Argosy Cruise Lines concluded that it was not economical to repair the fire damage. Lint moored the vessel in Bremerton and used it for special events. In 2016, Lint sold the vessel to the Astoria Ferry Group, and returned it to Astoria on August 1. As of 2019, the vessel is undergoing restoration.

MV Tourist No 2 partially sank in the Columbia River In front of Astoria where it was moored and for sale on July 28th 2022.

References

Ferries of Washington (state)
National Register of Historic Places in Kirkland, Washington
Cruise ships of the United States
Ships built in Astoria, Oregon
Ferries of Oregon